People's Charter may refer to:
 People's Charter of 1838 in the United Kingdom
 People's Charter for Change, Peace and Progress in Fiji
 The People's Charter (21st century), left-wing political movement in the United Kingdom

ru:Народная хартия